The Canadian National 47 is a preserved class "X-10-a" 4-6-4T type tank locomotive located at Steamtown National Historic Site in Scranton, Pennsylvania. It is one of only three preserved CN 4-6-4Ts (No. 49 at the Canadian Railway Museum in Delson, Quebec and CN No. 46 at Vallée-Jonction, Quebec) and is the only Baltic-type suburban tank locomotive remaining in the United States.

History
CN  47 was originally built by the Montreal Locomotive Works in September 1914 for the Grand Trunk Railway as its  1542, class K2, but became a CN locomotive after the creation of the Canadian National Railway in 1923. Its CN classification was X-10-a. Along with its sister locomotives,  47 was based in Montreal and was used exclusively in commuter service. Following retirement in June 1959,  47 was sold to F. Nelson Blount for $2,000, and it became a part of his collection in North Walpole, New Hampshire.  47 was the first locomotive to run excursions for Blount's Monadnock, Steamtown & Northern Railroad, and was intended to become the primary excursion power. It had been given a fresh overhaul in 1958 and was in top mechanical condition when acquired, as evidenced in tests performed by both the MS&N and the Hartford Steam Boiler Inspection and Insurance Company.

The locomotive entered service during the MS&N's first season in the summer of 1961 operating on the tracks of the Claremont and Concord Railway near New Hampshire's Lake Sunapee. The locomotive operated in revenue service for barely five weeks when the Interstate Commerce Commission (ICC) ordered it removed from service on August 26, 1961. The locomotive's maintenance records had been disposed of upon retirement by the Canadian National, resulting in several dates of past maintenance being absent on the MS&N's own inspection form. Complete copies of the maintenance records were eventually obtained from Canada's Board of Transit Commissioners in September 1961 (contrary to popular belief they were not lost in a fire), but the newfound records revealed that the locomotive had been due for boiler re-tubing when retired — work that was never completed by the Canadian National. Facing a costly re-tubing, Blount took the locomotive out of service, replacing it with a leased Claremont and Concord GE 70-ton switcher for seven days until the 1961 season came to a premature end on September 17, 1961.

The locomotive was put on static display in North Walpole after its last run and was later moved across the Connecticut River with the rest of the Steamtown, U.S.A. collection to Bellows Falls, Vermont.  47 was later moved with the rest of the collection in 1984 to Scranton, Pennsylvania, where it currently remains on static display outside in the yard of Steamtown National Historic Site.

References

0047
4-6-4T locomotives
MLW locomotives
Preserved steam locomotives of Canada
Individual locomotives of Canada
Passenger locomotives
Railway locomotives introduced in 1914
Standard gauge locomotives of Canada
Preserved steam locomotives of Pennsylvania